Ian Armit identifies the islet of Eilean Dòmhnuill ("The Isle of Donald"), Loch Olabhat, on North Uist, Scotland, as what may be the earliest crannog. Unstan ware pottery found there suggests a Neolithic period date of 3200–2800 BC. A surrounding timber screen and the turf-walled houses seem to have been repeatedly taken down and rebuilt, and in the final phase two oblong stone-footed structures bear a resemblance to Knap of Howar on Papa Westray, Orkney.

See also
 Prehistoric Scotland

References 
 Ian Armit Scotland's Hidden History. Stroud: Tempus (in association with Historic Scotland), 1998, 
 

4th-millennium BC architecture in Scotland
Populated places established in the 4th millennium BC
Crannogs in Scotland
North Uist
Freshwater islands of the Outer Hebrides
Stone Age sites in Scotland
Neolithic settlements
Former populated places in Scotland
Archaeological sites in the Outer Hebrides
Scheduled monuments in Scotland
Neolithic Scotland